The Municipality of Dobje is a municipality in eastern Slovenia. The area is part of the traditional region of Styria. The municipality is now included in the Savinja Statistical Region. The entire municipality has just over 1,000 inhabitants. Its seat is Dobje pri Planini.

Settlements
In addition to the municipal seat of Dobje pri Planini, the municipality also includes the following settlements:

 Brezje pri Dobjem
 Gorica pri Dobjem
 Jezerce pri Dobjem
 Lažiše
 Presečno
 Ravno
 Repuš
 Škarnice
 Slatina pri Dobjem
 Suho
 Večje Brdo
 Završe pri Dobjem

References

External links 

Municipality of Dobje on Geopedia

Populated places in the Municipality of Dobje
Dobje